Zlín (in 1949–1989 Gottwaldov;) is a city in the Czech Republic. It has about 73,000 inhabitants. It is the seat of the Zlín Region and it lies on the Dřevnice river. It is known as an industrial centre. The development of the modern city is closely connected to the Bata Shoes company and its social scheme, developed after the World War I. A large part of the city is urbanistically and architecturally valuable and is protected by law as an urban monument zone.

Administrative parts
Zlín is made up of 16 city parts and villages:

Zlín
Prštné (Zlín II)
Louky (Zlín III)
Mladcová (Zlín IV)
Příluky (Zlín V)
Jaroslavice (Zlín VI)
Kudlov (Zlín VII)
Malenovice (Zlín VIII)
Chlum
Klečůvka
Kostelec
Lhotka
Lužkovice
Salaš
Štípa
Velíková

Etymology
There are several legends about the origin of the name of the city, according to which it was derived from slín (i.e. "marl") or zlaté japko (i.e. "golden apple"). However, the name Zlín was most likely derived from the old personal Slavic name Zla, Zlen or Zleš.

From 1949 to 1989, the city was renamed Gottwaldov after the first communist president of Czechoslovakia Klement Gottwald. On 1 January 1990 the city's name was changed back to Zlín.

Geography
The city is situated on the Dřevnice river.

Zlín is entirely located in the Vizovice Highlands.

History

14h–16th centuries
The first written mention of Zlín is from 1322, when it was acquired by Queen Elizabeth Richeza. In that time, Zlín was already a market town and served as a craft guild centre for the surrounding area of Moravian Wallachia. From 1358, the Zlín estate was owned by Bishop Albrecht of Šternberk and soon became the seat of the Moravian branch of the Šternberk family. In 1397, the town privileges of Zlín were extended and Zlín became a town. This significantly helped the economic development of Zlín.

The Hussite Wars badly affected properties of the Sternbergs and they were forced to sell Zlín in 1437. In the second half of the 15th century, Zlín was threatened by the Bohemian–Hungarian War. The 16th century brought peace and prosperity to the town. Trade and crafts flourished, mainly drapery, pottery and shoemaking. New villages were founded in the vicinity of Zlín, which became a large town and economic centre.

17th–19th centuries

In 1605, Zlín was raided and burned by Hungarian rebels. The Thirty Years' War left the town severely damaged and half deserted. The residents of Zlín, along with people from the whole Wallachian region, led an uprising against the Habsburg monarchy. The rebellion was however bloodily suppressed in 1644. After the war, Zlín became property of the Hungarian noble family of Serényi, but they did not care much for the town, and therefore Zlín recovered only slowly.

Economic activity was restored in the 18th century. Larger industrial enterprises appeared in the mid-19th century. A small match factory was established in 1850 and a shoe factory in 1870, but both were soon closed, and the town continued to live mainly from the work of craftsmen. In 1899, the railway was built.

20th century

Zlín began to grow rapidly after Tomáš Baťa and his siblings founded a shoe factory there in 1894, known as Bata Company. Production gradually increased, as did the number of employees and the population of the town. Baťa's factory supplied the Austro-Hungarian army in World War I. Due to the remarkable economic growth of the company and the increasing prosperity of its workers, Baťa himself was elected mayor of Zlín in 1923.

Baťa became the leading manufacturer and marketer of footwear in Czechoslovakia in 1922. Besides producing footwear, the company diversified into engineering, chemistry, rubber technology and many more areas. The factory hired thousands of workers who moved to Zlín. A new large complex of modern buildings and facilities was gradually built by the Baťa's company on the outskirts of the town in 1923–1938. It included thousands of flats, schools, department stores, scientific facilities, and a hospital. The development took place in a controlled manner and was based on modern urban concepts with the contribution of important architects of the time. Zlín became a hypermodern industrial city with functionalist character unique in Europe.

After death of Tomáš Baťa in 1932, the company was managed by Jan Antonín Baťa, Hugo Vavrečka and Dominik Čipera, who also became the mayor. The Baťa company and also the city of Zlín continued growing. In 1929–1935, a strong economic agglomeration Zlín – Otrokovice – Napajedla has developed. In 1935, the city became the seat of the administrative district.

During the World War II, life in the city was controlled by German occupiers, and development  of both the city and the company stopped. Zlín was most severely affected by the war in 1944, when it was bombed by the U.S. army and large part of the factories was destroyed. Zlín was liberated by the Soviet and Romanian armies on 2 May 1945.

The communists took over management of Zlín and Baťa factories, and in October 1945 the Bata company in Czechoslovakia was nationalized. In the following decades, Zlín preserved its significant position thanks to its extensive industrial production. The city has strengthened its position as administrative, economic, educational and cultural centre of eastern Moravia. Zlín further expanded with construction of new housing estates.

Demographics

Transport

In the 1920s local passenger transportation started to operate. Later, in 1939 the town council decided to build three trolleybus routes, numbered lines A, B and C. New trolleybus lines were finished in 1944, after the construction proceeding during the Nazi occupation. Through the times, Zlín's public transport, now owned by DSZO (Zlín & Otrokovice Transportation Company), was one of the fastest-growing public transportation networks in the Czech Republic.

The city is currently served by 14 bus routes and 14 trolleybus routes, and also railway services on line 331, which runs from Otrokovice (located on the international corridor) to Vizovice. There are nine stations on this line within the city of Zlín, the largest of which is Zlín střed.

Education

In 1969, the Faculty of Technology was founded here as a branch of the Brno University of Technology. In 2001, it was one of two faculties which formed the newly established Tomas Bata University in Zlín. With more than 9,000 students, it ranks as a medium-sized Czech university. It is formed by six faculties: Technology, Management and Economics, Multimedia Communications, Applied Informatics, Humanities, and Logistics and Crisis Management.

Culture
Zlín is located in the cultural region of Moravian Wallachia near the tripoint of the cultural regions of Moravian Wallachia, Moravian Slovakia and Hanakia.

Given Zlín's history as one of the biggest centres of filmmaking in the Czech Republic, probably the biggest cultural event is the Zlín Film Festival with subtitle "International Film Festival for Children and Youth".

Winter version of international music festival Masters of Rock takes place in Zlín. It focuses mainly on death metal.

Zlín is home to the Bohuslav Martinů Philharmonic Orchestra; its chief conductor is Tomáš Brauner, while its principal guest conductor is Leoš Svárovský.

Sport
Zlín's ice hockey team PSG Berani Zlín plays in the Czech 1.liga and has won national titles in 2004 and in 2014. The football team FC Trinity Zlín plays in the Czech First League. The city also has teams in other sports including volleyball, basketball, Czech handball, softball and rugby.

Architecture

The city's architectural development was a characteristic synthesis of two modernist urban utopian visions: the first inspired by Ebenezer Howard's Garden city movement and the second tracing its lineage to Le Corbusier's vision of urban modernity. From the very beginning Baťa pursued the goal of constructing the Garden City proposed by Ebenezer Howard. However, the shape of the city had to be 'modernized' so as to suit the needs of the company and of the expanding community.

Zlín's distinctive architecture was guided by principles that were strictly observed during its whole inter-war development. Its central theme was the derivation of all architectural elements from the factory buildings. The central position of the industrial production in the life of Zlín inhabitants was to be highlighted. Hence the same building materials (red brick, glass, reinforced concrete) were used for the construction of all public (and most private) edifices.

Although modified by several variations, this high modernist style leads to a high degree of uniformity of buildings. It highlights the central and unique idea of an industrial garden city at the same time. Architectural and urban functionalism was to serve the demands of a modern city. The simplicity of its buildings translated into its functional adaptability was to prescribe (and react to) the needs of everyday life.

The urban plan of Zlín was the creation of František Lydie Gahura, a student at Le Corbusier's atelier in Paris. Le Corbusier's inspiration was evident in the basic principles of the city's architecture. On his visit to Zlín in 1935, he was appointed to preside over the selective procedure for new apartment houses. Le Corbusier also received a commission for creating the plan for further expansion of the city and the company. His plan represented a paradigm shift from his earlier conceptions of urban design. Here he abandoned an anthropomorphic, centralized city model in favor of the linear city format. The change in Le Corbusier's thinking was reflected by the abandonment of the à redents residential pattern in favor of free-standing slab blocks. His Zlín plan, however, was never fully adopted.

Sights

The Villa of Tomáš Baťa was an early architectural achievement. The construction was finished in 1911. The building's design was carried out by the architect Jan Kotěra. After its confiscation in 1945, the building served as a Pioneers' house. Being returned to Tomáš J. Baťa, the son of the company's founder, the building now houses the headquarters of the Thomas Bata Foundation.

Baťa's Hospital was founded in 1927 and quickly developed into one of the most modern Czechoslovak hospitals. The original architectural set up was designed by F. L. Gahura.

The Grand Cinema was designed by the architects Miroslav Lorenc and F. L. Gahura and built in 1932. This technological marvel became the largest cinema in Europe (2,580 seated viewers) in its time. The cinema also boasted the largest movie screen in Europe.

Tomas Bata Memorial was built in 1933 by F. L. Gahura. The original purpose of the building was to commemorate the achievements of Baťa. The building itself is a constructivist masterpiece. It has served as the seat of the Bohuslav Martinů Philharmonic Orchestra since 1955.

Baťa's Skyscraper was built as the headquarters for the worldwide Baťa organization. Designed by Vladimír Karfík, the huge building was erected in 1936–1939. It included a room-sized elevator housing the office for the boss, comfortably furnished – with a sink, a telephone, and air conditioning. After a costly reconstruction in 2004, it became the seat of the Regional Office of the Zlín Region and the headquarters of the tax office.

In the Štípa part of Zlín is located the Lešná Castle. It was built in the Neogothic, Neorenaissance and Neobaroque styles in 1887–1893. It is one of the youngest aristocratic residences in Moravia. The castle was built for the Seilern-Aspang family on the site of an older castle from the 18th century. Today the castle is open to the public and there are collections of unique and historically valuable objects. The castle is located inside the Zlín-Lešná Zoo complex. It is the second most-visited zoo in the country, and as of 2020, it was overall the fifth most visited tourist destination in the country.

In the Malenovice part of Zlín is located the Malenovice Castle. It was founded in the second half of the 14th century. The Gothic castle was modified in the Renaissance style in the following centuries. Today part of the castle is open to the public and contains several expositions.

Notable people

Tomáš Baťa (1876–1932), industrialist, founder of Bata Corporation
Miloslav Petrusek (1936–2012), sociologist
John Tusa (born 1936), British arts administrator, and radio and television journalist
Tom Stoppard (born 1937), British playwright and screenwriter
Josef Abrhám (1939–2022), actor
Eva Jiřičná (born 1939), architect
Ivana Trump (1949–2022), Czech-American businesswoman and model
Vladimír Hučín (born 1952), dissident and political celebrity
Stanislava Nopová (born 1953), author, poet and publisher
Roman Čechmánek (born 1971), ice hockey player
Tomáš Dvořák (born 1972), decathlete, Olympic medalist
Daniel Málek (born 1973), breaststroke swimmer
Roman Hamrlík (born 1974), ice hockey player
Petr Čajánek (born 1975), ice hockey player
Mojmír Hampl (born 1975), economist
Petr Janda (born 1975), architect
Jiří Novák (born 1975), tennis player
Silvia Saint (born 1976), pornographic film actress
Jan Zakopal (born 1977), footballer
Karel Rachůnek (1979–2011), ice hockey player

Twin towns – sister cities

Zlín is twinned with:

 Altenburg, Germany
 Chorzów, Poland
 Groningen, Netherlands
 Izegem, Belgium
 Limbach-Oberfrohna, Germany
 Möhlin, Switzerland
 Romans-sur-Isère, France
 Sesto San Giovanni, Italy
 Trenčín, Slovakia

Zlín also cooperates with Turin, Italy.

Gallery

References

Bibliography

External links

History of Zlín, old photos and postcards

 
Cities and towns in the Czech Republic
Populated places in Zlín District
Planned cities
Bata Corporation
Architecture related to utopias